Rakhyut is a Wilayat of Dhofar in the Sultanate of Oman.

History
In 1908, J.G. Lorimer recorded Rakhyut in his Gazetteer of the Persian Gulf, noting its location as being on the coast and roughly 13 miles west of Ras Sajar. He wrote:

References 

Populated places in Oman